Jump! (跳浪) is a Singaporean Chinese drama which aired on MediaCorp Channel U in May 2012. It was aired on weekdays in the 10pm time slot. The series features Jeanette Aw, Zhang Zhenhuan, and Taiwan-based Singaporean singer Wong Jing Lun in his acting debut.

Plot
Xiao Chunli is a Chinese teacher at Blue Sky Secondary School, neighbourhood school notorious for its rock-bottom results and delinquency. Her efforts to help her students are hampered by Mr Yan, the school principal who cares more about KPIs than the students themselves. One of the teachers Xu Dele is a master with the skipping rope and he begins recruiting students to participate in a double Dutch competition. Much to Miss Xiao and Mr Xu's frustration, several of the more problematic students or those rejected by other CCAs are "dumped" into the team.

Mr Xu and his students embark on a quest to win a medal at the competition. The students learn some valuable lessons about life and teamwork along the way.

Cast

Awards & Nominations

Star Awards 2013

References

External links
Official Website
Jump! on Facebook

Singapore Chinese dramas
2012 Singaporean television series debuts
Channel U (Singapore) original programming